Macrocoma oromiana is a species of leaf beetle found on Alegranza in the Canary Islands and on Selvagem Grande in the Savage Islands, described by  in 1978.

References

oromiana
Beetles of North Africa
Insects of the Canary Islands
Savage Islands
Beetles described in 1978